The College of Psychologists of British Columbia is the regulatory body for psychologists in the province of British Columbia (BC), Canada. 
 processing of applications for registration as a psychology practitioner in BC. They maintain a website that enables verification of registration with the College.
 investigating of complaints related to a psychologist’s practice and conduct
 quality assurance

References

Psychology organizations based in Canada
Organizations based in Vancouver